Qomlijeh (also Romanized as Qomlījeh; also known as Qomīlījeh) is a village in Howmeh Rural District, in the Central District of Harsin County, Kermanshah Province, Iran. At the 2006 census, its population was 125, in 24 families.

References 

Populated places in Harsin County